Francisco Olegario Segura (June 20, 1921 – November 18, 2017), better known as Pancho "Segoo" Segura, was a leading tennis player of the 1940s and 1950s, both as an amateur and as a professional.   He was born in Guayaquil, Ecuador, but moved to the United States in the late 1930s. Throughout his amateur career he was listed by the USTA as a "foreign" player resident in the U.S. As a professional player, he was referred to as the "Ecuadorian champ who now lives in New York City". After acquiring U.S. citizenship in 1991 at the age of seventy, Segura was a citizen of both countries, although he never represented the U.S. in tennis competition.

He is the only player to have won the Cleveland/Forest Hills US Pro and International Pro titles on three different surfaces (which he did consecutively from 1950–1952). He won the inaugural professional Tournament of Champions at Sydney in 1957. He won the L. A. Masters tournament in 1958. In 1950, 1951, and 1952, as a professional, he was the U.S. No. 1 professional player in the USPLTA rankings and was also ranked U.S. number one professional for 1950 and 1952 in the PTPA rankings.

Segura's most potent shot was considered to be his double-handed forehand. His less-potent backhand was single-handed. He played collegiate tennis for the Miami Hurricanes at the University of Miami in Coral Gables, Florida.

Early life
Segura was born in Guayaquil, Ecuador, the first of seven children of Domingo Segura Paredes and Fransisca Cano. He almost died at his premature birth, then suffered from hernias and malaria.  No more than 5'6" (1.68 m) tall, he had badly bowed legs from the rickets that he also had as a child. In spite of this, he had extremely fast footwork and a devastating two-handed forehand that his frequent adversary and tennis promoter Jack Kramer once called the greatest single shot ever produced in tennis.

By the time he was 17, Segura had won a number of titles in Latin America and was offered a tennis scholarship by Gardnar Mulloy, tennis coach at the University of Miami. He won the National Collegiate Singles Championship for three straight years: in 1943, 1944, and 1945.

Amateur career

1941
Segura won the Brooklyn clay court championships in May beating Ladislav Hecht in the final. "Segura, who speaks very little English (he's here nine months), was too excited to talk after the match." He won the Hispano invitation event in August beating Frank Bowden in the final. Segura lost in the second round of the U. S. Championships to Bryan Grant in five sets. "Segura had the usually sedate Forest Hills fans in the aisles with his attack, similar to that of Jack Bromwich, the double-fisted Australian. He was a strong crowd favorite but Grant drew a ringing round of applause for his comeback in the final set after Segura seemingly had him beaten down." Pancho won the Dade County championships in December beating Gardnar Mulloy in the final. Segura "captured a four-set battle which had several hundred wild-eyed spectators almost standing on their heads." Segura then lost in the final of the Sugar Bowl to Ted Schroeder. "Segura, who amazed the crowd with his ability to retrieve seemingly impossible shots, won the first two sets before Schroeder, seeded No. 1, overcame wildness and began passing the Ecuadorean consistently".

1942
Segura won the Florida west coast title in February beating George Lyttleton Rogers in the final. Segura beat Bill Talbert to win the Cincinnati event in June. Segura successfully defended his title at Brooklyn in July, beating Hecht in the final in four sets. At the New Jersey state tournament the following week, Segura beat Vic Seixas and Budge Patty before a win in three straight sets over Hecht in the final when he didn't lose a single game. The following week Segura beat Schroeder to win the Eastern clay court championships. "Segura's two-handed drives down the sidelines kept Schroeder on the defensive throughout and afforded the Californian few opportunities to move in close. While Segura's emphasis was on speed, he threw in an occasional dropshot to add to Schroeder's discomfiture".
Segura beat Mulloy to win the Longwood Bowl in August 1942. At the U. S. Championships, Segura beat Talbert before losing to Parker in the semi finals. "Regardless as to any plan Segura may have had in mind before the match started, he was at Parker's mercy at every stage of the duel". Segura beat Earl Bartlett to win the Sugar Bowl in December.

1943

Segura won the Pan American championships in Mexico City in January beating Talbert in the final in five sets. He won the Miami tournament over Campbell Gillespie in February. Segura won New Jersey event in July over Robert Odman. Segura beat Joe Hunt in the final of the Eastern grass court championships in August. "Segura, now a student In Florida, was on the top of his game while Hunt weakened rapidly following the first set. After being trounced soundly in the second, the sailor changed to spiked shoes in hopes of turning the tide but gained little benefit". The following week Segura beat Sidney Wood to win Southampton invitation. Despite having won several tournaments in the weeks before the U. S. Championships, Segura lost in the semi finals of the event to Jack Kramer. Segura won the Pan American championships in Mexico City over Talbert in October (a familiar opponent in the final of this tournament).

1944

In June, Segura won US clay court event and the following week won at Cincinnati (both over Talbert).  Pancho won the Western states tournament in July over Talbert in five gruelling sets in which both player had suffered leg injuries and had to take time out for treatment. Segura won Southampton invitation with a four set victory over McNeill in August. Segura lost to Talbert in five sets in the semi finals of the U. S. Championships. "What made Talbert's victory so surprising was the fact that it was achieved in five strength-sapping sets. The Indianapolis lad was rated as a 'sprinter' by most experts, and figured to lack the vitality to win over the route. But Bill more than balanced in strategy what he spotted the energetic Ecuadorian in stamina." Segura won the Pan American championships at Mexico City in October (again beating Talbert in the final).

1945
Segura won the Roney Plaza event at Miami in May over Charles Harris. Talbert beat Segura in five sets in the final of the national clay court championships in July. At U. S. Championships, Segura beat Bob Falkenburg before losing again to Talbert in the semi finals. "Charging the net with effectiveness as he and Talbert squared off in the famed center court, Pancho forged into a 4-to-l lead as Talbert netted shot after shot. But then Talbert rammed back through Segura's service three straight times, lost his own once and put the set away by ruining Segura's delivery with cross court drop shots in the twelfth game. From there on it was no contest. Pancho tried but he just didn't have it".

1946

Segura won US Indoors event over McNeill in March. "The South American parlayed superb passing shot and an uncanny defensive game into the triumph that took the title out of the United States for the first time since Jean Borotra carted it to France in 1931". Pancho won the Miami tournament over Talbert in April. Segura won the title at Queens over Dinny Pails in June. "Segura walked off the court a very tired man. But, although near exhaustion, he summoned just sufficient reserve strength in the final set to retrieve enough shots to win". Segura lost in the third round of Wimbledon to Tom Brown. Segura lost in the last 16 of the French championships in July (held after Wimbledon this year) to eventual winner Marcel Bernard. "In the most spectacular match of the tournament to date Roland Garros stadium echoed with Segura's cry of 'Oh Pancho' with which he berated his own mistakes." Segura lost to Mulloy in the quarter finals of the U. S. Championships in four sets.

1947

Segura won La Jolla Beach and Tennis Club tournament over Tom Falkenburg in February. Segura lost to Drobny in the first round of Wimbledon. Kramer wrote that Segura lost "without distinction (to Tom Brown and Jaroslav Drobný) the two times he played Wimbledon, and really, nobody took Segoo seriously. He didn't speak English well, he had a freak shot, and on the grass while scooting around in his long white pants with his bowlegs, he looked like a little butterball. A dirty butterball: his pants were always grass-stained". Segura won Southampton invitation over Seymour Greenberg in August. Segura lost to Parker in the quarter finals of the U. S. Championships.  Segura won the title at Sao Paulo in November beating Parker in the final and beat Parker again later that month in the Rio de Janeiro final.

Professional career

1948

Long before Open Tennis, Segura turned professional in 1947 and was an immediate crowd-pleaser with his winning smile, infectiously humorous manner, and unorthodox but deadly game.  According to Bobby Riggs, Jack Harris (the promoter of the forthcoming Riggs-Kramer tour for 1948) attempted to sign Ted Schroeder to play the preliminary matches of the tour. Ultimately he failed and instead signed Segura to play the latest Australian amateur champion, Dinny Pails. Instead of a percentage of the gross receipts, as Riggs and Kramer were contracted for, Segura and Pails were each paid $300 a week.  Segura lost the tour 44–26. At the US Pro championships at Forest Hills in June 1948, Segura lost in the quarter finals against Frank Kovacs."Segura held command over Kovacs through the first two sets when the Californian was never able to break his opponent's service. But in the third game of the third set, Kovacs cracked through to assume a 2-1 lead and he grew progressively stronger from that point."

1949

Segura lost a tough match to Kramer in five sets in the semi finals at the Wembley Pro championships in June. "When Kramer made a lot of bad shots at the beginning of the fifth set and Segura reached 3-1, it appeared as if the champion was facing a defeat. Yet it was the gallant little Segura who faltered and allowed the champion to crawl home." Kramer also beat Segura in the semi finals of the tournament at Scarborough in July.

1950

Segura won the 1949-50 tour against Frank Parker 63–12 (they played the preliminary match each night before Kramer and Gonzales took to the court). Segura won a four-man tournament at Paris in January. In the semi-final of the 1950 U.S. Pro Championship held in Cleveland on clay, Segura won a come-from-behind five set match over Kramer, and went on to beat Kovacs in the final. Segura was rated the U.S. number one professional for 1950 by the U.S. Professional Lawn Tennis Association as a result of this win. He was also ranked U.S. No. 1 professional by the PTPA.

1951

In the 1950–1951 world professional tour in which Segura played the headline match against Kramer he was beaten 64 matches to 28, a noticeably better performance, however, than Gonzales's record of 29 victories and 94 defeats against Kramer the year before. Segura won the Canadian Pro title in June beating Kovacs in the final, although he lost the Cleveland International Pro or U.S. Pro final to Kovacs in a close five-set match. Segura's victory in the 1951 U.S. Pro Championship at Forest Hills over Pancho Gonzales in the concluding round robin was sufficient to give him the number one U.S. professional ranking by the USPLTA for 1951. Segura won a tournament at Berlin in September, beating Gonzales in the concluding round robin. Segura lost to Gonzales in four sets in the final at Wembley in September. Segura won a four-man tournament at the Bygdøhus Arena in Oslo in October beating Carl Earn in the semi finals and Gonzales in the final.

1952

Segura won the U. S. Pro Clay Court title at St. Augustine in March beating Riggs in the final. Segura won the U. S. Pro or International Professional Championships (billed title) at Cleveland on cement in June over Budge and Gonzales. Segura won the Canadian Pro in June at Quebec City on clay beating Budge in the final. Segura won the Roland Garros round-robin event in Paris in June. Segura won a four-man event at Stockholm in October beating Budge in the final.
For the calendar year of 1952, Segura was ranked as the U.S. No. 1 professional player by the U.S. Professional Lawn Tennis Association for the third straight year, with Gonzales at no. 2. The PTPA ranked Segura as U.S. number one professional ahead of Gonzales in second place.

1953

In 1953, Segura was reduced to playing the preliminary match on the World Series tour, where he beat the Australian Ken McGregor 72 matches to 24. In July, Segura won a round robin in Caracas beating Frank Sedgman, McGregor and Kramer. On August 1, 1953, Segura won the Slazenger Professional Championship at Scarborough, England on grass (an event dubbed by the media "the pro Wimbledon"). He won come-from-behind five set matches over McGregor in the semi-final and Sedgman in the final, the latter at 8-6 in the fifth set. Segura won a four-man tournament in Munich in September beating Sedgman in the final. Segura beat Sedgman in the Lyon final (another 4-man event) in November to bring the year to a close. In June, the Players Committee of Jack March's Cleveland U. S. Pro or "World's Professional Championship" tournament ranked Segura second.

1954

Segura participated in a World Series tour with Gonzales, Sedgman and Budge (who was later replaced by Riggs and Earn). Gonzales won the series with Segura finishing in second place. Segura was runner-up to Gonzales in the 1954 U.S. Pro final at L.A., losing a close five set final. Segura won the Pacific Coast Pro at Beverly Hills in August over Gonzales. At the Australian Pro in November, Segura beat Gonzales before losing in the final to Sedgman. Segura was ranked second in 1954 by International Professional Tennis Association.

1955

Segura faced Gonzales in the final at Cleveland in April 1955. This event was played under Van Alen Simplified Scoring System (VASSS).  In the final, Segura lost to Gonzales in five VASSS sets. Segura toured Europe with Gonzales, McGregor and Fred Perry in the summer of 1955. Segura was ranked second in 1955 by International Professional Tennis Association.

1956

In 1955-56, Gonzales and Tony Trabert played the feature match of the World Series tour.  Segura beat Rex Hartwig 56-22 (Segura and Hartwig played the preliminary match each evening). Segura beat Trabert in the final of the Hamilton Pro in Bermuda in April. Segura beat Trabert in the semi finals at the VASSS event in April in Cleveland before losing to Gonzales in the final. "Although Gonzales said he would not 'participate in another championship if the ping-pong scoring system is used', Segura said he was for it, claiming it made the matches more even". The event returned to traditional scoring in 1957.

1957

In February 1957, Segura won the inaugural Ampol Tournament of Champions at White City, Sydney, the richest tournament of the year. The TOC was the most prestigious series of pro tournaments in the late 1950s, and the Australian version was funded by Ampol, the Australian oil company.  Segura defeated Hartwig in five sets in the first round, came from behind to beat Gonzales at 13-11 in the fifth set in the semi-final, and won in three straight sets over Sedgman in the final. Segura regarded this as his greatest tournament win. Kramer designated the Sydney tournament as one of the four major professional tournaments, together with Kooyong, Forest Hills, and L.A. Masters. Segura beat Pails in a North American tour that was the undercard tour for the World Series (the main contest featured Gonzales against Ken Rosewall). Segura beat Rosewall in the semi finals at Cleveland in April, but lost to Gonzales in the final. Segura beat Gonzales in the semi finals at Wembley in September, but lost in the final to Rosewall.

1958

Segura lost a North American tour to Trabert by a narrow margin (this tour was a World Series undercard tour. The main  contest featured Gonzales against Lew Hoad). In May, Segura won the Alaska Pro championships beating Trabert in the final. In July, Segura won the L.A. Masters Pro Championship in Los Angeles. Segura defeated all six opponents in a round robin format, Gonzales, Hoad, Rosewall, Trabert, Sedgman, and Hartwig. Kramer designated the L.A. Masters as one of the four major professional tournaments, together with Forest Hills, Kooyong, and Sydney.

1959

At the Wembley Pro in September, part of the Ampol world series of tournaments, Segura beat Hoad and Trabert before losing to Mal Anderson in the final. "Anderson's singles final with Segura was a memorable one, and not until the last few games of the deciding set did he really get on top of an opponent sixteen years older than himself". On October 25, 1959, Segura won the Ramat Gan tournament at Tel Aviv in Israel, beating Anderson, Ashley Cooper and Mervyn Rose. Segura defeated Hoad (the winner of the Ampol series) three times that year in the series, at Melbourne for 3rd place, at Wembley in the 2nd round, and in the final event at Kooyong in the round robin.

1960

Segura participated in a 4-man World series with Gonzales (world champion since 1954), Rosewall and Alex Olmedo (Trabert also played matches early on). Gonzales won the series. At Wembley Segura beat Hoad in the quarter finals. "Segura twinkled and dazzled, scuttling about the court at a speed that made it impossible for anyone to believe that he was 39 years old". In the semi finals, Segura overcame Sedgman. "Towards the end of his three-hour semifinal with Sedgman he showed signs of tiring. He missed chances that might have given him an earlier victory, yet he still was able to make the final effort that gave him a break in the ninth game of the fifth set and the match". Segura lost to Rosewall in the final.

1961

Segura won four-man tournaments in Sao Paulo and Rio de Janeiro in May while touring South America with Cooper, Olmedo and Butch Buchholz. Segura won the San Remo event in July over Hoad and Andres Gimeno and then won the Viareggio event over Hoad and Trabert. At Noordwijk in August, Segura beat Gonzales, Trabert and Gimeno to win the title.

1962

Segura lost to Buchholz in the Cleveland final in May 1962 when he was nearly 41 years old. On August 5, 1962, Segura won the Dutch Pro Championships at The Hague, Holland, on red clay, beating Ayala, Hoad, and Olmedo. At Cave de Tirreni in August, Segura beat Ayala, Olmedo and Anderson to win the title. On August 15, 1962, Segura won the pro tournament at Cannes, France, beating Ayala, Olmedo, and Hoad in the best-of-five set final in three straight sets.

1963-1970

Segura won the California Pro at Monterrey in August 1965 (beating Leonzie Collas in the final). He won the Fresno tournament in October 1965 (beating Nick Carter in the final) At Binghamton Pro in July 1966, 45 year old Segura beat Rosewall in the semi finals before losing in the final to Rod Laver. At the Fresno tournament in October 1966, Segura retained his title (beating Barry MacKay in the final). Segura also won the USPLTA title at Milwaukee in November 1966 beating Mike Davies in the final. As the Open era arrived, Segura's career was coming to an end.  He entered the U. S. Open in 1968 and lost in the third round to Laver. His final Grand Slam singles appearance was at 1970 U. S. Open aged 49, where he beat Atet Wijono (a man 30 years younger than him), before losing to Tito Vazquez in round two.

Career assessment

In his 1979 autobiography Kramer included Segura in his list of the 21 greatest players of all time.

Kramer went on to say, "... and while his amateur record is of no consequence, he beat everyone in the pros but Gonzales and me.  We beat him with good second serves". A year earlier, another World No. 1 player, Ellsworth Vines, the man that Kramer called the greatest player of all time at the height of his game, had published a lesser-known book called Tennis: Myth and Method, co-written with Gene Vier. Vines devotes the first part of the book to individual chapters about the ten greatest tennis players from Don Budge through the date of the book's publication. He considered Segura to be the fifth best of these ten great players, behind, in order, Budge, Kramer, Gonzales, and Rod Laver. Segura, however, ranked above Bobby Riggs, Ken Rosewall, Lew Hoad, Frank Sedgman, and Tony Trabert.

Vines also gives an expert's analysis of Segura's unusual playing style: Two-handed forehand is most outstanding stroke in game's history; unbeatable unless opponent could avoid it. Improved as a professional by taking advantage of volleying ability he rarely used as an amateur. Backhand also better later in career. Returns serve brilliantly, particularly off right side where quicksilver moves give him unusual positioning talent. Serve only average for his class of player but well placed, as is overhead. Very deft volleyer, particularly off forehand. Lob and dropshot unsurpassed. Superb passing shots, change of pace, and absolute consistency make him greatest "little man" to ever play the game.

Segura, says Kramer, probably played "more matches against top players than anyone in history. Besides my couple hundred, he must have played Gonzales a hundred and fifty, and Budge, Sedgman, Riggs, Hoad and Rosewall all around fifty apiece.  I beat him about 80 percent of the time, and Gonzales also held an edge over him. Pails beat him 41–31 on the Kramer-Riggs tour, but that was when Segoo was still learning how to play fast surfaces.  With everybody else, he had the edge: Sedgman, Rosewall, Hoad, Trabert, McGregor". Kramer and Hoad regarded Segura's two-handed forehand as the greatest single tennis stroke that they had ever faced.
According to Kramer,

Kramer goes on to say, however, that with Segura:

Retirement
In 1962, on the recommendation of good friend Mike Franks, Segura became the teaching professional at the Beverly Hills Tennis Club, replacing Carl Earn. Most of Pancho's students were movie stars such as Dinah Shore, Doris Day, Julie Andrews, Richard Conte, Shelley Winters, Charlton Heston, Barbra Streisand, Dina Merrill, Kirk Douglas, Robert Evans, Lauren Bacall, Gene Hackman, Carl Reiner, Barbara Marx, George C. Scott, Janet Leigh, and Ava Gardner, as well as Dean Paul Martin.

Segura also found time to coach Jimmy Connors, Tracy Austin, Charlie Pasarell, and Stan Smith, four great tennis champions, as well as his son Spencer Segura, who played at UCLA, and is a lawyer/investor. In 1971, he left Beverly Hills to become the head teaching professional at the La Costa Resort in Carlsbad, California, where he eventually retired. He is widely credited with having mentored and structured the playing game of Jimmy Connors, starting at age 16, in 1968, when his mother, Gloria, brought him to Pancho in California for lessons. Dr. Abraham Verghese describes taking a tennis lesson from Segura during this period in his book The Tennis Partner.

Before the famous "Battle of the Sexes" tennis match between Billie Jean King and Bobby Riggs in 1973, Segura openly supported Riggs. When King won the match, Segura declared disgustedly that Riggs was only the third-best senior player, behind himself and Gardnar Mulloy. He challenged King to another match, which King refused.

In the 1966 episode of I Dream of Jeannie titled "Always on Sunday", Segura made a cameo appearance as himself.

Segura retired from playing Singles after the 1970 US Open at Forest Hills at age 49.

Segura was inducted into the International Tennis Hall of Fame in Newport, Rhode Island, in 1984.

Segura became an American citizen in 1991.

Death
Segura died on November 18, 2017, at the age of 96 at his home in Carlsbad, California, from complications related to Parkinson's disease. A memorial service for the  celebration of his life was held at the Beverly Hills Tennis Club on December 17, 2017 with 200 in attendance. Spencer Segura was master of ceremonies, with 10 featured speakers including Burt Bacharach, Jimmy Connors, Mike Franks, Cliff Richey, Charlie Pasarell, Tracy Austin, and David Kramer.

Major career finals

Grand Slam

Doubles (2 runner-ups)

Mixed doubles (2 runner-ups)

Pro Slams

Singles (3 titles, 8 runner-ups)

Performance timeline

Singles
Segura joined the professional tennis circuit in 1948 and as a consequence was banned from competing in the amateur Grand Slams until the start of the Open Era at the 1968 French Open. Segura won one Tournament of Champions.

The results of the Pro Tours are not listed here.

References

Sources

 The Game, My 40 Years in Tennis (1979), Jack Kramer with Frank Deford
 Tennis: Myth and Method, (1978) by Ellsworth Vines and Gene Vier, Viking Press, New York
 Man with a Racket by Pancho Gonzales, (1959) as told to Cy Rice
 Mental Tennis, (1994), by Vic Braden
 Jimmy Connors, King of the Courts, (1978) by Francene Sabin
 Jimmy Connors Saved My Life, (2004) by Joel Drucker
 ''As it Was, (2009) by Gardnar Mulloy

External links

 
 
 

1921 births
2017 deaths
American male tennis players
Deaths from Parkinson's disease
Ecuadorian emigrants to the United States
Ecuadorian male tennis players
Miami Hurricanes men's tennis players
Sportspeople from Carlsbad, California
Sportspeople from Guayaquil
International Tennis Hall of Fame inductees
College tennis coaches in the United States
Tennis people from California
Professional tennis players before the Open Era
American tennis coaches
World number 1 ranked male tennis players